Department of Agriculture ( – Dānshakadeh-ye Keshāvarzī) is a village and government facility in Nazluchay Rural District, Nazlu District, Urmia County, West Azerbaijan Province, Iran. At the 2006 census, its population was 72, in 20 families.

References 

Populated places in Urmia County